"7 Days" is a song by British singer Craig David. It was released on 24 July 2000 as the second single from his debut studio album, Born to Do It (2000). "7 Days" topped the UK Singles Chart. Outside the United Kingdom, "7 Days" peaked within the top ten of the charts in many countries, including Australia, Canada, Denmark, the Netherlands, New Zealand, the Republic of Ireland and the United States. It received a Gold sales certification from the British Phonographic Industry and became Britain's 17th best-selling single of 2000. In 2001, the song was nominated for the BRIT Award for Best Single (losing out to Robbie Williams' "Rock DJ"), and in 2003, it was nominated for the Grammy Award for Best Male Pop Vocal Performance. There is also a remix produced by DJ Premier featuring Mos Def.

Music video

Synopsis

The music video was directed by Max & Dania. It starts in a barber's shop, where two guys are on duty. One is giving another guy a haircut and the other is sweeping up hair clippings. David, wearing his trademark beanie hat, walks up to the window and knocks on it. He and the barber appear to know each other well and after greeting him with a handshake and a hug, David asks the guy if he is busy. The guy says "No, no, it's cool," and David sits down to get his hair done, asking for "the usual". The guy then asks David what happened to him last week and he says "I've had the strangest week ever!". Taking David's hat off and looking at his hair, the guy goes "I can see!" and David recounts the week that has just gone past.

The week begins with David waking up on Monday morning at 11:00 AM to the sound of a fast-talking DJ who is playing "7 Days" on the radio. Having left the TV on the previous night, David sees a story on the news about a firefighter who rescued a baby from a burning building. He turns the TV off and stands up, and as he does, the DJ says "Just rewind and come again". A rewinding noise is heard and the song starts again; a few hours later, David is walking around Southampton and is on the way to see his friends. He sees a busker with a guitar and an open case for donations but walks past him. He also sees a newsstand where the main headline is the story about the firefighter which he saw on the TV earlier. A girl walking by David breaks her high heel and he grabs her hand to stop her from falling to the ground. An old lady sits on a bench with a balloon but lets go of it and it floats away. As he walks through a subway, three boys run past and one of them steps on David's shoe, leaving a speck of mud on it. David walks to the exit of the subway and he sees a beautiful 24-year-old woman wearing sunglasses walking towards him. She asks him what time it is and he pulls back his left sleeve to check his watch, but suddenly realises that he isn't wearing it and the woman walks away. These scenes are intercut with scenes at the hairdresser's in the present day, where David is singing the song to the guy cutting his hair (the parts of the lyrics which are questions, such as "Didn't she mind?", "What was the deal?" and "So, was she keen?" are asked by the hairdresser).

After going to bed that night, David wakes up and is surprised to find the day beginning in an identical fashion to the previous day. He goes to the newsstand and asks the man what day it is, and the man says it's Monday. David realises that everyone except him is oblivious to what is going on. The same events occur again – the busker is out, girl breaks her high heel, the old lady loses her balloon, the kid steps on David's shoe and the woman in the subway entrance asks him for the time but he has again forgotten his watch. The next morning, it's Monday again and everything happens for a third time, but this time David remembers to put on his watch before leaving, he gives the busker some money, is prepared for the girl falling, rescues the balloon, dodges the kids in the subway and is able to give the woman the time, before asking her out for a drink tomorrow; she accepts his offer and they exchange numbers.

The next night, Tuesday finally comes, but after getting into his car to go and pick his date up, David is shocked when he realises that the fuel gauge is empty. Panicking, he phones his date, but she is already at the restaurant. He arrives, runs inside and the scene skips to the next morning: it's Monday again, but this time David smiles. After getting up and going out, he tells the girl to watch out before she falls and he catches the old lady's balloon before it flies away and gives it back to her. He makes it to his date on time, but in mid-conversation, he knocks over his glass of red wine and spills it all over her. However, he then reaches up behind him and presses a pause button which appears out of nowhere (stopping time and the song playing in the background), before standing up and stepping out into the outline of the screen and skipping to a point where both glasses are empty. After getting to the right moment, he steps back into the picture, sits back down and presses play. David and his woman leave the restaurant and go back to his house, where they "make love" for four days straight.

Back at the barber's, David sings a cappella the lyric "we were making love by Wednesday, and on Thursday and Friday and Saturday, we chilled on Sunday.", but the barber shakes his head and refuses to believe the story.

Accolades
At the 2001 BRIT Awards, the video was nominated for the Award for Best Music Video but lost out to the video for "Rock DJ" by Robbie Williams.

Chart performance
On 30 July 2000, the song debuted at number one the UK Singles Chart after selling more than 100,000 copies in its first week, giving David his second consecutive UK number-one single. spending fifteen weeks inside the UK top 75. It became David's only top ten single on the US Billboard Hot 100, where it reached number ten. The song also reached number four in Australia and number six in New Zealand.

Track listings

UK CD1
 "7 Days" (radio edit)
 "Stop Messing Around"
 "Fill Me In" (acoustic)
 "7 Days" (video)

UK CD2
 "7 Days" (radio edit)
 "7 Days" (Full Crew radio mix)
 "7 Days" (Sunship remix)
 "7 Days" (Full Crew remix featuring MDK)

UK cassette single
 "7 Days" (radio edit)
 "Fill Me In" (acoustic)

European CD single
 "7 Days" (radio edit) – 3:54
 "7 Days" (Full Crew radio mix) – 4:43

Australian CD single
 "7 Days" (radio edit)
 "7 Days" (Full Crew remix edit)
 "7 Days" (Sunship remix)
 "7 Days" (Full Crew remix featuring MDK)
 "Fill Me In" (acoustic)
 "7 Days" (video)

US and Canadian CD single
 "7 Days" (DJ Premier remix) – 4:22
 "7 Days" (DJ Premier remix without rap) – 2:59
 "7 Days" (featuring Fat Joe) – 4:53
 "7 Days" (Full Crew remix) – 4:22
 "7 Days" (acoustic) – 4:39
 "7 Days" (Sunship remix) – 6:40
 "7 Days" (video)

Charts

Weekly charts

Year-end charts

Certifications

Release history

Cover versions
The song has been covered by Zoot Woman.
British indie pop band Bastille covered the song in 2016 for BBC Radio 1's Live Lounge.

References

2000 singles
2000 songs
Craig David songs
Songs written by Craig David
UK Singles Chart number-one singles
Songs about casual sex